USCGC Lawrence Lawson is the 20th  to be delivered to the United States Coast Guard.
She was built at Bollinger Shipyards, in Lockport, Louisiana, and delivered to the Coast Guard, for her sea trials, on October 20, 2016. She was commissioned on March 18, 2017. She is the second cutter of her class to be the homeported at the Coast Guard Training Center in Cape May, New Jersey, and also the second to be stationed outside of the Caribbean.

Like her sister ships, Lawrence Lawson is primarily devoted to search and rescue, and interception of drug and people smugglers. The vessels are designed to support a crew of approximately two dozen, for missions of up to five days. The 58 Sentinel-class cutters will replace the slightly smaller s.

Homeported in Cape May

The homeport of Lawrence Lawson and her sister ship,  is the Coast Guard Training Center in Cape May.  According to the Cape May County Herald local citizens welcome the Coast Guard presence, and its contribution to the local economy.

Operational history

Days after President Donald Trump announced he was making a large cut to the Coast Guard's budget the Coast Guard diverted Lawrence Lawson to Washington DC, where senior members of the military and Congress toured the vessel.

Her first commanding officer was LCDR Joe Rizzo, a 2005 graduate of the United States Coast Guard Academy

Namesake

In 2010, Master Chief Petty Officer of the Coast Guard Charles "Skip" W. Bowen, the U.S. Coast Guard's senior enlisted person at the time, lobbied for the new Sentinel-class cutters to be named after enlisted Coast Guardsmen, or personnel from its precursor services, who had distinguished themselves by their heroism. 
The vessel is named in honor of Lawrence O. Lawson, who served as the United States Lifesaving Service's stationkeeper, in Evanston, Illinois, and who lead the crew of his oar-powered surfboat into icy, stormy waters in the widely celebrated rescue of the entire crew of the steamship Calumet.

References

2016 ships
Ships built in Lockport, Louisiana
Sentinel-class cutters